Morning Dance is the second album by the jazz fusion group Spyro Gyra. The album was released in March 9, 1979 and was certified gold by the RIAA on September 19, 1979, and was certified platinum on June 1, 1987.

At Billboard magazine, the album reached No. 27 on the Top 200 albums chart, while the song "Morning Dance" reached No. 24 on the Hot 100 songs chart and No. 1 on the Adult Contemporary songs chart. In Canada, the album reached No. 47 in its 10th week, and returned to No. 49 in its 20th week of 25 in the top 100.

Track listing and personnel 

 "Morning Dance" (Jay Beckenstein) – 3:58
 Jay Beckenstein – alto saxophone
 Jeremy Wall – electric piano
 John Tropea – electric and acoustic guitars
 Jim Kurzdorfer – bass
 Ted Reinhardt – drums
 Rubens Bassini – congas and percussion
 Dave Samuels – marimba and steel drums
 "Jubilee" (Jeremy Wall) – 4:31
 Jay Beckenstein – alto saxophone
 Jeremy Wall – electric piano and synthesizers
 John Tropea – electric guitar
 Will Lee – bass
 Steve Jordan – drums
 Rubens Bassini – congas and percussion
 Dave Samuels – marimba
 Randy Brecker – trumpet solo
 "Rasul" (Jeremy Wall) – 3:57
 Jay Beckenstein – soprano and tenor saxophones
 Jeremy Wall – acoustic and electric pianos
 Rick Strauss – guitar
 Jim Kurzdorfer – bass
 Ted Reinhardt – drums
 John Clark – French horn
 "Song for Lorraine" (Jay Beckenstein) – 3:59
 Jay Beckenstein – soprano saxophone
 Tom Schuman – electric and acoustic pianos 
 Suzanne Ciani – synthesizers
 Chet Catallo – guitar
 Jim Kurzdorfer – bass
 Eli Konikoff – drums
 Gerardo Velez – bongos, congas, percussion
 Lani Groves, Diva Gray and Gordon Grody – vocalists
 "Starburst" (Jeremy Wall) – 4:50
 Jay Beckenstein – tenor saxophone (intro)
 Jeremy Wall – electric piano and synthesizers
 John Tropea – guitar
 Will Lee – bass
 Steve Jordan – drums
 Rubens Bassini – congas, timbales, percussion
 Michael Brecker – tenor saxophone solo
 "Heliopolis" (Jay Beckenstein) – 5:34
 Jay Beckenstein – alto saxophone, boobams, percussion
 Jeremy Wall – electric piano and synthesizers
 Tom Schuman – Rhodes piano solo
 John Tropea – guitar
 Will Lee – bass
 Steve Jordan – drums
 Rubens Bassini – congas, timbales, percussion
 Dave Samuels – marimba
 "It Doesn't Matter" (Chet Catallo) – 4:27
 Jay Beckenstein – soprano saxophone
 Tom Schuman – electric and acoustic pianos
 Suzanne Ciani – synthesizer
 Jeremy Wall – synthesizer
 Chet Catallo – guitar
 Jim Kurzdorfer – bass
 Eli Konikoff – drums
 Gerardo Velez – congas
 Lani Groves, Diva Gray and Gordon Gordy – vocalists
 "Little Linda" (Jeremy Wall) – 4:27
 Jay Beckenstein – alto saxophone
 Jeremy Wall – electric piano, acoustic piano, percussion
 Rick Strauss – guitar
 Jim Kurzdorfer – bass
 Ted Reinhardt – drums
 Rubens Bassini – bongos and percussion
 Dave Samuels – vibraphone
 "End of Romanticism" (Rick Strauss) – 5:00
 Jay Beckenstein – soprano saxophone
 Jeremy Wall – electric piano
 Tom Schuman – synthesizer solos
 Rick Strauss – 6 and 12-string electric guitars
 Jim Kurzdorfer – bass
 Ted Reinhardt – drums
 Dave Samuels – marimba
 John Clark – French horn

Additional Personnel Credits
 Larry Fast – synthesizer programming 
 Jeremy Wall – string arrangements and conductor, horn arrangements and conductor (1-5, 7, 8, 9)
 Jay Beckenstein – horn arrangements and conductor (6)

Horn section
 Lew Del Gatto – flutes
 Jay Beckenstein – alto saxophone
 Michael Brecker – tenor saxophone
 Tom Malone – trombone
 Randy Brecker – trumpet

Strings
 Charles McCracken – cello
 Alfred Brown – viola
 Harry Cykman – violin
 Charles Libove – violin
 Harry Lookofsky – violin, concertmaster
 Matthew Raimondi – violin

Charts

Production 
 Jay Beckenstein – producer 
 Richard Calandra – producer
 Jeremy Wall – assistant producer 
 Michael Barry – recording, mixing 
 Jack Malken – recording, mixing
 Charlie Conrad – recording
 Mick Guzauski – recording
 Larry Swist – recording
 Jason Corsaro – assistant engineer
 Darroll Gustamachio – assistant engineer
 Candice Munson – assistant engineer
 Rick Rowe – editing
 Bob Ludwig – mastering 
 Peter Corriston – art direction, design 
 Julie Heffernan – illustration

Studios
 Recorded at Secret Sound (New York, NY); PCI Studios (Rochester, NY); Trackmaster Audio (Buffalo, NY); House of Music (West Orange, NJ).
 Mixed and Edited at Secret Sound
 Mastered at Masterdisk (New York, NY).

References

1979 albums
Spyro Gyra albums
MCA Records albums